William Langton (or William of Rotherfield; died 1279) was a medieval English priest and nephew of Archbishop Walter de Gray. William was selected but never consecrated as Archbishop of York and Bishop of Carlisle.

Langton was the son of Robert de Gray of Rotherfield Greys, who was the brother of Walter de Gray, Archbishop of York. Langton held the prebend of Strensall by 24 June 1245. He was named Archdeacon of York by 21 September 1249. By 23 April 1255 he was the rector of Great Mitton, West Riding, Yorkshire, and was named Dean of York by 16 March 1262. On 12 March 1265 was elected to fill the Archbishopric of York, however his election was quashed in November 1265 by the pope. He continued to hold office as Dean and was elected Bishop of Carlisle on 13 December 1278 but refused the office.

Langton died on 15 July 1279 and was buried in the south transept of York Minster.

Citations

References

 
 
 
 
 
 

Archbishops of York
Deans of York
1279 deaths
13th-century English Roman Catholic bishops
Archdeacons of Richmond
Burials at York Minster
Year of birth unknown